Internet censorship in Pakistan is government control of information sent and received using the Internet in Pakistan. There have been significant instances of website access restriction in Pakistan, most notably when YouTube was banned from 2012–2016. Pakistan has asked a number of social media organisations to set up local offices within the country, but this is yet to happen.

Pakistan made global headlines in 2010 for blocking Facebook and other Web sites in response to a contest popularized on the social networking site to draw images of the Islamic prophet Muhammad. In general, Internet filtering in Pakistan remains both inconsistent and intermittent, with filtering primarily targeted at content deemed to be a threat to national security, pornography and at religious content considered blasphemous. Wikipedia was banned in February 2023 due to blasphemous content but was unbanned after a few days though. 

In 2019, the National Assembly Standing Committee on Information Technology and Telecom was informed by Pakistan Telecommunication Authority (PTA) that 900,000 URLs were blocked in Pakistan for "reasons such as carrying blasphemous and pornographic content and/or sentiments against the state, judiciary or the armed forces."

Overview 

In mid-2012 Pakistanis had relatively free access to a wide range of content, including most sexual, political, social, and religious sites on the Internet. The OpenNet Initiative listed Internet filtering in Pakistan as substantial in the conflict/security area, and as selective in the political, social, and Internet tools areas in August 2012. Additionally, Freedom House rated Pakistan's "Freedom on the Net Status" as "Not Free" in its Freedom on the Net 2022 report. This is still true as of 2022.

Internet filtering in Pakistan is regulated by the Pakistan Telecommunications Authority (PTA) and the Federal Investigation Agency (FIA) under the direction of the government, the Supreme Court of Pakistan, and the Ministry of Information Technology (MoIT). Although the majority of filtering in Pakistan is intermittent—such as the occasional block on a major Web site like Blogspot or YouTube—the PTA continues to block sites containing content it considers to be blasphemous, anti-Islamic, or threatening to internal security. Online civil society activism that began in order to protect free expression in the country continues to expand as citizens utilize new media to disseminate information and organize.

Pakistan has blocked access to websites critical of the government or the military. Blocking of websites is often carried out under the rubric of restricting access to "blasphemous" content, pornography, or religious immorality. At the end of 2011, the PTA had officially banned more than 1,000 pornographic websites in Pakistan.

Pakistan Internet Exchange 

The Pakistan Internet Exchange (PIE), operated by the state-owned Pakistan Telecommunication Company Ltd (PTCL), was created to facilitate the exchange of Internet traffic between ISPs within and outside of Pakistan. Because the majority of Pakistan's Internet traffic is routed through the PIE (98% of Pakistani ISPs used the PIE in 2004), it provides a means to monitor and possibly block incoming and outgoing Internet traffic as the government deems fit.

Internet surveillance in Pakistan is primarily conducted by the PIE under the auspices of the PTA. The PIE monitors all incoming and outgoing Internet traffic from Pakistan, as well as e-mail and keywords, and stores data for a specified amount of time. Law enforcement agencies such as the FIA can be asked by the government to conduct surveillance and monitor content. Under the Prevention of Electronic Crimes Ordinance (PECO), ISPs are required to retain traffic data for a minimum of 90 days and may also be required to collect real-time data and record information while keeping their involvement with the government confidential. The ordinance does not specify what kinds of actions constitute grounds for data collection and surveillance.

Pakistan Telecommunication Company 
In April 2003, the PTCL announced that it would be stepping up monitoring of pornographic websites. "Anti-Islamic" and "blasphemous" sites were also monitored. In early March 2004, the Federal Investigation Agency (FIA) ordered Internet service providers (ISPs) to monitor access to all pornographic content. The ISPs, however, lacked the technical know-how, and felt that the PTCL was in a better position to carry out FIA's order. A Malaysian firm was then hired to provide a filtering system, but failed to deliver a working system.

National URL filtering and blocking system 
In March 2012, the Pakistan government took the unusual step of touting for firms that could help build it a nationwide content-filtering service. The Pakistan Telecommunications Authority published a request for proposals for the "deployment and operation of a national level URL Filtering and Blocking System" which would operate on similar lines to China's Golden Shield, or "Great Firewall". Academic and research institutions as well as private commercial entities had until 16 March to submit their proposals, according to the request's detailed 35-point system requirements list. Key among these is the following: "Each box should be able to handle a block list of up to 50 million URLs (concurrent unidirectional filtering capacity) with processing delay of not more than 1 milliseconds".

Jyllands-Posten Muhammad cartoons 
The Jyllands-Posten Muhammad cartoons controversy began after 12 editorial cartoons, most of which depicted the Islamic prophet Muhammad, were published in the Danish newspaper Jyllands-Posten on 30 September 2005. This led to protests across the Muslim world, some of which escalated into violence with instances of firing on crowds of protestors, resulting in more than 100 reported deaths, and included the bombing of the Danish embassy in Pakistan, setting fire to the Danish Embassies in Syria, Lebanon and Iran, storming of European buildings, and the burning of the Danish, Dutch, Norwegian, French, and German flags in Gaza City. The posting of the cartoons online added to the controversy.

On 1 March 2006 the Supreme Court of Pakistan directed the government to keep tabs on Internet sites displaying the cartoons and called for an explanation from authorities as to why these sites had not been blocked earlier. On 2 March 2006, pursuant to a petition filed under Article 184(3) of the Constitution of Pakistan, the Supreme Court sitting en banc ordered the Pakistan Telecommunications Authority (PTA) and other government departments to adopt measures for blocking websites showing blasphemous content. The Court also ordered Attorney General Makhdoom Ali Khan to explore laws which would enable blocking of objectionable websites. In announcing the decision, Chief Justice Iftikhar Muhammad Chaudhry, said, "We will not accept any excuse or technical objection on this issue because it relates to the sentiments of the entire Muslim world. All authorities concerned will have to appear in the Court on the next hearing with reports of concrete measures taken to implement our order".

Consequently, the government kept tabs on a number of websites hosting the cartoons deemed to be sacrilegious. This ban included all the weblogs hosted at the popular blogging service blogger.com, as some bloggers had put up copies of the cartoons – particularly many non-Pakistani blogs.

A three-member bench headed by Chief Justice Chaudhry, summoned the country's Attorney General as well as senior communication ministry officials to give a report of "concrete measures for implementation of the court's order". At the hearing on 14 March 2006, the PTA informed the Supreme Court that all websites displaying the Muhammad cartoons had been blocked. The bench issued directions to the Attorney General of Pakistan, Makhdoom Ali Khan, to assist the court on how it could exercise jurisdiction to prevent the availability of blasphemous material on websites the world over.

The blanket ban on the blogspot.com blogs was lifted on 2 May 2006. Shortly thereafter the blanket ban was reimposed and extended to Typepad blogs. The blanket ban on the blogspot.com blogs was later lifted again.

Allegations of suppressing vote-rigging videos by the Musharraf administration were also leveled by Pakistani bloggers, newspapers, media, and Pakistani anti-Musharraf opposition parties. The ban was lifted on 26 February 2008.

Social media and platform blocking 
YouTube was blocked in Pakistan following a decision taken by the Pakistan Telecommunication Authority on 22 February 2008 because of the number of "non-Islamic objectionable videos." One report specifically named Fitna, a controversial Dutch film, as the basis for the block. Pakistan, an Islamic republic, ordered its ISPs to block access to YouTube "for containing blasphemous web content/movies." The action effectively blocked YouTube access worldwide for several hours on 24 February. Defaming Muhammad under § 295-C of the Blasphemy law in Pakistan requires a death sentence. This followed increasing unrest in Pakistan by over the reprinting of the Jyllands-Posten Muhammad cartoons which depict satirical criticism of Islam. Router misconfiguration by one Pakistani ISP on 24 February 2008 effectively blocked YouTube access worldwide for several hours. On 26 February 2008, the ban was lifted after the website had removed the objectionable content from its servers at the demand of the Government of Pakistan.

On 19 and 20 May 2010, Pakistan's Telecommunication Authority PTA imposed a ban on Wikipedia, YouTube, Flickr, and Facebook in response to a competition entitled Everybody Draw Mohammed Day on Facebook, in a bid to contain "blasphemous" material The ban imposed on Facebook was the result of a ruling by the Lahore High Court, while the ban on the other websites was imposed arbitrarily by the PTA on the grounds of "objectionable content", a different response from earlier requests, such as pages created to promote peaceful demonstrations in Pakistani cities being removed because they were "inciting violence". The ban was lifted on 27 May 2010, after the website removed the objectionable content from its servers at the Demand of the government. However, individual videos deemed offensive to Muslims that are posted on YouTube will continue to be blocked.

In September 2012, the PTA blocked the video-sharing website YouTube for not removing an anti-Islamic film made in the United States, Innocence of Muslims, which mocks Muhammed. The website would remain suspended, it was stated, until the film was removed. In a related move, the PTA announced that it had blocked about 20,000 websites due to "objectionable" content.

On 25 July 2013, the government announced that it is mulling over reopening YouTube during the second week of August. A special 12-member committee was working under the Minister of IT and Telecommunication, Anusha Rahman, to see if objectionable content can be removed. The Pakistan Telecommunications Authority, the telecom watchdog in the country, has already expressed its inability to filter out select content.

On 21 April 2014, Pakistan's Senate Standing Committee on Human Rights requested the Federal Government remove the ban on YouTube.

On 8 February 2015, the government announced that YouTube will remain blocked 'indefinitely' because no tool or solution had been found which can totally block offensive content. As of June 2015 — 1,000 days on — the ban was still in effect, and YouTube cannot be accessed from either desktop or mobile devices.

The ban was lifted due to technical glitch on 6 December 2015 according to ISPs in Pakistan.  As September 2016, the ban has been lifted officially, as YouTube launched a local version for Pakistan.

On 25 November 2017, the NetBlocks internet shutdown observatory and Digital Rights Foundation identified mass-scale blocking of social media and content-sharing websites including YouTube, Twitter and Facebook throughout Pakistan imposed by the government in response to the violent Tehreek-e-Labaik protests. The technical investigation found that all major Pakistani fixed-line and mobile service providers were affected by the restrictions, which were lifted by the PTA the next day when protests abated following the resignation of Minister for Law and Justice Zahid Hamid.

In 2019, The National Assembly Standing Committee on Information Technology and Telecom was informed by the PTA that 900,000 URLs were blocked in Pakistan for "reasons such as carrying blasphemous and pornographic content and/or sentiments against the state, judiciary or the armed forces."

On 9 October 2020, TikTok was banned by the PTA for "immoral content" 

On 16 April 2021, various social media applications were banned. The Ministry of Interior ordered the PTA to restrict access of Pakistani users to Twitter, Facebook, WhatsApp, YouTube, and Telegram. It was issued to block these social media websites from 11:00 AM to 03:00 PM on Friday with an immediate effect. The reason to put a temporary ban on these social media platforms was not mentioned on the official notice. Later on, PTA explained the ban by putting forward the statement, "In order to maintain public order and safety, access to certain social media applications has been restricted temporarily." There was a severe condition in Pakistan due to Tehreek-e-Labbaik Pakistan anti-France protests. The condition became more intense after Pakistan announced to ban Tehreek-e-Labbaik Pakistan under Anti-Terror Law.

On Sunday 5 February 2023, Wikipedia was banned due to not removing purportedly blasphemous materials but it could still be accessed using the app. The ban was lifted on Tuesday 7 February 2023, with the PM Office stating, "Blocking the site in its entirety was not a suitable measure to restrict access to some objectionable contents and sacrilegious matter on it."

Netsweeper usage 
In June 2013, the Citizen Lab interdisciplinary research laboratory uncovered that Canadian internet-filtering product Netsweeper to be in use at the national level in Pakistan. The system has categorized billions of URLs and is adding 10 million new URLs every day. The lab also confirmed that ISPs in Pakistan are using methods of DNS tampering to block websites at the behest of Pakistan Telecommunication Authority.

According to the report published by the lab, "Netsweeper technology is being implemented in Pakistan for purposes of political and social filtering, including websites of secessionist movements, sensitive religious topics, and independent media."

On 6 September 2022, YouTube was temporarily blocked coinciding with the duration of a livestream of a political protest by the PTI calling for a General Election after the ouster of Imran Khan in April.

2020 rules 
In October 2020 Government of Pakistan issued new policy rules called Citizens Protection (Against Online Harm) Rules 2020 or the Removal and Blocking of Unlawful Content (Procedure, Oversight and Safeguards) under 2016 Prevention of Electronic Crimes Act (PECA).

The government of Pakistan intends to access internet user data and control and remove objectionable content. The companies would be required to remove or block any asked content from their websites within 24 hours after being reported by Pakistani authorities, social media companies or internet service providers face may be fined of up to $3.14 million (€2.57 million) for failure to curb the sharing of content deemed to be defamatory of Islam, promoting terrorism, hate speech, pornography or any content viewed as problematic to Pakistan's national security.

Rights activists complain that new rules are compromising user privacy at mercy of Pakistani establishment sans judicial oversight, likely to erode media freedom and freedom of expression further there by erode political freedoms and result in increased censorship.

Since then, dating apps like Tinder are banned in Pakistan, video sharing app named TikTok faced a temporary ban til removed content; issued notices to U.S.A. based Ahmadiyya community web portal TrueIslam.com, Google and Wikipedia for returning search results displaying Ahmadiyya community and their leadership, Mirza Masroor Ahmad, 's claims of Muslimness.

Blocked by Pakistan Telecommunication Authority

Video games ban

PUBG ban 
In July 2020, PTA banned the online game PlayerUnknown's Battlegrounds Many social media activists like Waqar Zaka uploaded videos on YouTube urging Pakistanis to speak up against this ban. Millions of social media users of Pakistan have flooded sites like Facebook, Twitter and have shown overwhelming support for PUBG (PlayerUnknown's Battlegrounds). In response, PTA lifted ban on the popular online game.

Pornography ban

Other notable bans 
 Richard Dawkins's website and the Internet Movie Database (IMDb) were blocked for brief periods in 2013.
 Xbox Live and GameRanger were blocked accidentally on 7 February 2013 by the Pakistan Telecom Authority.
 Major Torrenting Websites. In July 2013, Pakistani ISPs banned 6 of the top 10 public Torrent sites in Pakistan. These sites include Piratebay, Kickass torrents, Torrentz, Bitsnoop, Extra Torrent and Torrent Reactor. They also banned the similar site Mininova. However proxies for these torrent sites are still active and P2P connections are working normally. This move lead to a massive public backlash, especially from the Twitter and Facebook communities of Pakistan. In the aftermath of such critique, the IT Minister of Pakistan, Anusha Rahman, deactivated her Twitter account. Popular BitTorrent client μTorrent is also banned in Pakistan, it gives an "ERR_SSL_PROTOCOL_ERROR", but with a virtual private network (VPN), the site works, users are facing this issue from few years, still facing in 2022.
 Pouet, a website about demoscene was banned as of 19 June 2015.
 Imgur, a website about image sharing/hosting was banned in December 2015. Reddit (NSFW content only) was also banned in 2019. No reason have been given for these bans.
 An extreme form of word censorship is effective on all website's URLs. URLs containing words like sex, porn are blocked, this includes pages on medical information sites like WebMD, MedicineNet about sexual health and couples therapy. This is similar to word censorship in effect for SMS and text messages.

See also 
 Censorship in Pakistan
 Censorship in South Asia
 Constitution of Pakistan
 Freedom of speech in Pakistan
 Freedom of the press in Pakistan
 Information technology in Pakistan
 Internet in Pakistan
 Pornography in Pakistan

References

External links 
 "Ban on the web in the national interest" (Urdu), Reba Shahid, BBC Urdu.com, 29 July 2006, (English translation)
 Karachi Union of Journalists, website

 
Mass media in Pakistan
Law of Pakistan
Pakistan
Pakistan
Censorship in Pakistan
Censorship
History of mass media in Pakistan